Swastham Grihabharanam is a 1999 Indian Malayalam-language film directed by Ali Akbar and produced by Kamarudeen K. The film stars Mukesh, Jagathy Sreekumar, Sukanya and Jagadish in lead roles. The film had musical score by Berny-Ignatius. the songs are written by chittur gopi.

Plot

Unni(Mukesh) is the son of late Balan master, a reputed social service person in the village. Unni is unemployed and decides to start a living and working as a Fishmonger. However he gets into trouble with Moori Moosa, the goon in the market. This tosses Unni into the rivalry between local tycoons, Veerabhadran Nair (Rajan P Dev) and Bhargava Kurup (N F Varghese)

Cast
Mukesh as Unni
Jagathy Sreekumar as Pachu
Sukanya as Aswathi
Jagadish as Appu
Rajan P Dev as Veerabhadran Nair
N F Varghese as Pattatharayil Bhargava Kurup
K. P. A. C. Lalitha as Unni's Mother
Paravoor Ramachandran as Captain
Indrans as Vilakkoothi Vasu
Mamukkoya as Mammathu
Vijaykumar as Shibu
Junior Mandrake Sidharaj as Balan Mashu 
Tony as Madhu
K. P. A. C. Azeez as Pathrose
Kalpana as Sarala
Machan Varghese as Damodaran
Lissy Jose as VeeraBhadran Nair’s Wife
Aliyar as Govindan

Soundtrack
The songs were composed by Berny Ignatius with lyrics by Chittoor Gopi.

References

External links
  
 

1999 films
1990s Malayalam-language films
Films scored by Berny–Ignatius